The Rural Municipality of Rocanville No. 151 is a rural municipality (RM) in the Canadian province of Saskatchewan within Census Division No. 5 and  Division No. 1. It is located in the southeast portion of the province.

History 
The RM of Rocanville No. 151 incorporated as a rural municipality on December 9, 1912.

Demographics 

Economy 
Agriculture is the major industry in the RM.

Attractions 
The historic Fort Espérance is located within the RM.

Government 
The RM of Rocanville No. 151 is governed by an elected municipal council and an appointed administrator that meets on the second Thursday of every month. The reeve of the RM is Murray Reid while its administrator is Sylvia Anderson. The RM's office is located in Rocanville.

Transportation 
The Rocanville Airport, a private airport owned by Potash Corporation of Saskatchewan, is located within the RM.

References 

 
Rocanville
Division No. 5, Saskatchewan